The Edgemere Handicap was an American Thoroughbred horse race. Inaugurated in 1901 at the old Aqueduct Racetrack, it was open to horses of all ages and contested on dirt at a distance of one mile and seventy yards. The following year the distance was changed to one mile and one furlong.

In 1902 and again in 1908, the race was won by a two-year-old. Allan, a colt owned and trained by Frank M. Kelly was the first then Fashion Plate won in 1908. 

On June 11, 1908, the Republican controlled New York Legislature under Governor Charles Evans Hughes passed the Hart-Agnew anti-betting legislation. The owners of Aqueduct Racetrack, and other racing facilities in New York State, struggled to stay in business without income from betting. The Edgemere Handicap was a victim of necessary cost cutting measures and as a result here was no race between 1909 and 1916. A February 21, 1913 ruling by the New York Supreme Court, Appellate Division saw horse racing return in 1913.  However, the Edgemere was not revived until 1917 and to fit horsemen's needs, the race conditions were modified to make it a contest for horses age three and older.

The Edgemere Handicap remained at Aqueduct Racetrack until 1956 when it was hosted by the Jamaica Racetrack at a mile and a sixteenth. The final edition was run on June 20, 1957 at Belmont Park.

A new Edgemere Handicap was established at Aqueduct Racetrack in 1960 which in 1981 was  renamed the Red Smith Handicap.

Records
Speed record:
 1:48.40 @ 1-1/8 miles: Hash (1939)

Most wins:
 2 – Peanuts (1925, 1926)
 2 - Hash (1939, 1940)

Most wins by a jockey:
 4 - Eddie Arcaro  (1939, 1940, 1942, 1949)

Most wins by a trainer:
 4 - James E. Fitzsimmons  (1921, 1929, 1932, 1943)
 4 - John M. Gaver Sr.  (1939, 1940, 1942, 1951)

Most wins by an owner:
 4 - Greentree Stable  (1939, 1940, 1942, 1949)

Winners

References

Discontinued horse races in New York City
Graded stakes races in the United States
Aqueduct Racetrack
Recurring sporting events established in 1901
Recurring events disestablished in 1957
1901 establishments in New York City
1957 disestablishments in New York (state)